Chełmno land (or Kulmerland, Old Prussian: Kulma) is a part of the historical region of Pomerelia, located in central-northern Poland.

Chełmno land is named after the city of Chełmno (historically also known as Culm). The largest city in the region is Toruń; another bigger city is Grudziądz.

It is located on the right bank of the Vistula river, from the mouth of the Drwęca (southern boundary) to the Osa (northern). Its eastern frontier is Lubawa Land.

The region, depending on the period and interpretation, may be included in other larger regions: Mazovia, Pomerania or Prussia. Currently in Poland it is classified as part of Pomerania, due to strong connections with Gdańsk Pomerania in recent centuries, with which it is collectively called the Vistula Pomerania (Pomorze Nadwiślańskie), although it also has close ties with neighboring Kuyavia. As a result it forms part of the Kuyavian-Pomeranian Voivodship, although a small part of the Chełmno Land is located in the Warmian-Masurian Voivodeship. Initially it was the westernmost part of Mazovia within medieval Poland, especially after the fragmentation of Poland. According to German historiography, it is classified as part of Prussia, although it did not form part of pre-Christian Prussia and was not inhabited by the Old Prussians, but by Slavic Lechites, who in the 10th century became part of the emerging Polish state.

History

The first historical account of Chełmno and Chełmno Land dates back to 1065 when Bolesław II of Poland granted a tax privilege to an abbey in a nearby Mogilno. The document lists Chełmno ("Culmine") along with other towns which then belonged to the province of Masovia. The area, being closest to the Polans, came to be populated by the Lechitic Kuyavians and tribes from Greater Poland. The Masovians were led by Masos, who left the Polish duke Boleslaw I and sought refuge with the Prussians. When this area was subdued by the rulers of the Polans Chełmno became a local centre of castellany (kasztelania). Chełmno Land was Christianised in the 11th century.

According to the will of Duke Bolesław III Wrymouth, Chełmno Land, after his death in 1138 became a part of the Duchy of Masovia governed by his son Bolesław IV the Curly and his descendants during the feudal fragmentation of Poland.

By the 13th century the territory was subject to raids by pagan Old Prussians, who sacked Chełmno, the province's main town, in 1216. In 1220 Conrad I of Masovia, with the participation of the other dukes of Poland, led a partial reconquest of the province, but the project of establishing a Polish defense of the province failed due to conflicts between the dukes. He brought the crusading Knights of Dobrzyń to Masovia, where they built a castle at Dobrzyń in 1224 as a base for attacks against the Prussians. As a result, the territory was again sacked and devastated by Prussian raids, which led to depopulation of the province.

Being involved in dynastic struggles elsewhere and too weak to deal with the Prussians alone, Conrad needed to safeguard and establish borders against the heathen Old Prussians, because his territory of Masovia was also in danger after the Prussians besieged Płock. Conrad awarded the already devastated Chełmno Land to the Teutonic Knights, giving them Nieszawa at first. He also brought in German settlers to Płock.

In 1226 Duke Conrad I of Masovia enlisted the aid of the Teutonic Order to protect Masovia and help convert the Prussians to Christianity. In return, the knights were to keep Chełmno Land as a fief. The land constituted the base of the Monastic State of the Teutonic Knights, and its later conquest of Prussia.

The Teutonic Order obtained an Imperial bull from Emperor Frederick II before entering Prussia. In 1243 the papal legate William of Modena divided Prussia into four dioceses under the archbishop of Riga, with the town becoming the nominal see of the Roman Catholic Diocese of Chełmno (however, the cathedral and the residence of the bishop were located actually in the adjacent Chełmża).

In 1440 the anti-Teutonic Prussian Confederation was founded, and among its founders were cities of the Chełmno Land, including Toruń, Chełmno, Grudziądz and Brodnica. The city councils of Chełmno and Toruń, and the knights of Chełmno Land were the official representatives of the confederation. In 1454 the confederation started an uprising against the Teutonic Order and turned to Polish King Casimir IV Jagiellon with a request to reunite the region with Poland. The king agreed and signed the incorporation act, after which the Thirteen Years' War broke out. The representatives from the region, incl. nobility, knights, mayors and local officials, solemnly swore allegiance to the Polish King and the Kingdom of Poland in an official ceremony held in Toruń in 1454. The war ended in a Polish victory and by the Second Peace of Toruń in 1466, the return of Chełmno Land to the Polish Crown was confirmed. It administratively formed the Chełmno Voivodeship, located in the Royal Prussia province, later also in the larger Greater Poland Province. Its capital was Chełmno, while the largest city was Toruń, which as a royal city became one of the largest and wealthiest cities of Poland, and was the site of numerous significant events in the history of Poland. In 1997 the Medieval Town of Toruń was designated a UNESCO World Heritage Site and in 2007 Toruń's historic center was added to the list of Seven Wonders of Poland. Other most valuable heritage sites include the Old Town of Chełmno and the Grudziądz Granaries, both listed alongside Toruń as Historic Monuments of Poland, the most important cultural heritage monuments in the country.

In 1772 as a result of the First Partition of Poland, Chełmno Land (with the exception of Toruń, annexed in 1793) was seized by the Kingdom of Prussia. Between 1807 and 1815 Chełmno Land was a part of the Polish Duchy of Warsaw and Toruń was even the duchy's temporary capital in April and May 1809. In 1815 it was annexed by Prussia again, first it became part of the Grand Duchy of Posen, but in 1817 was incorporated into the province of West Prussia. Following the Treaty of Versailles, Chełmno Land was returned to Poland in January 1920, after the Poles regained independence in 1918. In the interwar period it formed the southern part of the Pomeranian Voivodeship with the capital in Toruń.

Following the invasion of Poland, which started World War II in September 1939, it was occupied by Nazi Germany and unilaterally annexed in October, however, lacking any international recognition. During the occupation, the Polish population was subjected to various crimes, incl. mass arrests, imprisonment, slave labor, kidnapping of children, deportations to Nazi concentration camps and extermination. The Germans carried out the Intelligenzaktion, a planned mass murder of the local Polish elites. Major sites of massacres of Poles in the region included Klamry, Łopatki, Barbarka (present-day district of Toruń), Brzezinki, Małe Czyste, Płutowo and Nawra. Already in autumn of 1939, about 23,000 Poles of the pre-war Pomeranian Voivodeship were murdered. Nevertheless, the Polish resistance movement was still organized in the region, with Toruń being the seat of one of the six main commands of the Union of Armed Struggle in all of occupied Poland. In January 1945 it was captured by the Red Army and the German occupation of this part of Poland ended.

Cities and towns
The region is currently inhabited by around 650,000 people. There are 14 cities and towns in the region. The largest are Toruń and Grudziądz.

 Brodnica
 Chełmno
 Chełmża
 Golub-Dobrzyń
 Grudziądz
 Jabłonowo Pomorskie
 Kowalewo Pomorskie

 Lidzbark
 Lubawa
 Łasin
 Nowe Miasto Lubawskie
 Radzyń Chełmiński
 Toruń
 Wąbrzeźno

Sports
The most successful and popular sports clubs in the region include motorcycle speedway teams KS Toruń and GKM Grudziądz, ice hockey team TKH Toruń and basketball teams Twarde Pierniki Toruń (men) and Energa Toruń (women). The Speedway Grand Prix of Poland, part of the Speedway Grand Prix, is held annually at the MotoArena Toruń in Toruń.

Gallery

References

 Ziemia Chełmińska w przeszłości: wybór tekstów źródłowych [Chełmno Land in past: selection of source texts], ed. by Marian Biskup. Toruń 1961.

External links
 1500s Map of Old Prussian Land (Altpreussen) with Culmerland, Sassen, Galindia (Michelau and Löbau) on the Border to Masovia to the south of Prussia, before arrival of Teutonic Knights

Historical regions in Poland
Ziemias